Joseph Harris may refer to:
 Joseph Harris (stage actor) (c.1650–1715), English actor and playwright
 Joseph John Harris (1699–1769), English organist and composer
Joseph Harris (astronomer) (1702–1764), British blacksmith, astronomer, navigator, economist and natural philosopher
Joseph Harris (organist) (1744–1814), English organist and composer
Joseph Harris (Gomer) (1773–1825), Welsh Baptist minister, author, and journal editor
Joseph Strelley Harris (1811–1889), pastoralist and magistrate in the south-west of Western Australia
Joseph Harris (Wisconsin politician) (1813–1889), member of the Wisconsin State Senate
Joseph Smith Harris (1836–1910), civil engineer and president of the Reading Railroad
Joseph Harris (trade unionist) (born 1866), Irish trade unionist and political activist
Joseph Henry Harris (1888–1952), Canadian businessman and politician
Joseph Harris (rower) (1913–1974), Canadian Olympic rower
Joseph Harris (cricketer) (born 1965), Indian-born Canadian cricketer
Joseph Allen Harris (1888–1967), Canadian politician and research chemist, discoverer of promethium (element 61)
Joseph C. Harris (born 1940), American medievalist and scholar

See also 
Joe Harris (disambiguation)